Darvish (also Darvish or Darvich; in Persian: درويش) is a given name and a surname. It is an alternate transliteration of the Persian word "dervish", referring to a Sufi aspirant. 

People named Darvish or Darvich include:

Darvish Fakhr (born 1969), Canadian-born Iranian-American painter
Darvish Khan (1872–1926), Persian  classical musician
Darvish Mohammad Khan (died 1551), Khan of Sheki (1524–1551)
Amir Darvish, American actor
Kenji Darvish, a member of the Japanese visual kei "air" rock band Golden Bomber
Khashyar Darvich, American documentary film producer and director
Saeko Darvish (born 1986), Japanese actress Saeko (actress), ex-wife of Yu Darvish
Yu Darvish (born 1986), Japanese pitcher in Major League Baseball

See also
Darwish
Dervish (disambiguation)
Derviş

Persian-language surnames